Peter Wolfe may refer to:
Peter Wolfe (musician), British musician and poet
Peter Wolfe (sports rankings), owner of a computer system that ranks college football teams
Peter Wolfe, character in Alias Nick Beal
Peter Wolfe, character in Rocko's Modern Life

See also
Peter Wolf (disambiguation)
Peter Wolff (disambiguation)